Le Poët-Laval is a rural commune in the Drôme department of the Auvergne-Rhône-Alpes region of southeastern France.

Population

See also
Communes of the Drôme department

References

Communes of Drôme
Plus Beaux Villages de France